Jacob Boreel (1 April 1630, in Amsterdam – 21 August 1697, in Velsen) was an ambassador in France, sheriff and burgomaster of Amsterdam in 1696. Between 1664 and 1665 he travelled through Russia with his friend Nicolaes Witsen. In 1679, he became the ambassador in Paris. He is remembered in Velsen as the owner of the buitenplaats called Beeckestijn, who financed improvements to the house and gardens to the design that has been kept up until today.

In 1690, as a sheriff he was involved in a case with Romeyn de Hooghe. On the day before the mayors were appointed, the house of Boreel on 507 Herengracht was attacked by the mob. All the furniture, mirrors and expensive porcelain were destroyed, taken home, or thrown into the canal. Boreel, overweight and unwell, had to flee over the neighbor's fence.

Family
His father Willem Boreel was a baron of England.

External links
 Nottingham University manuscript catalogue 

1630 births
1697 deaths
Mayors of Amsterdam
Diplomats from Amsterdam
Ambassadors of the Netherlands to France